(a)spera is the fourth studio album by American singer-songwriter Mirah, released on March 10, 2009. Produced by Phil Elverum, it met with a largely positive reception from music critics. According to PopMatters about the album, "The musical marriage of Mirah and Elvrum is one of those rare perfect meeting of the minds—Jay-Z and Kanye, Butch Vig and Kurt Cobain, Phil Spector and... basically anyone who can sing.

Production and release
(a)spera was the first album after a four-year hiatus by Mirah, after time spent working on collaborations and remixes of previous albums. Phil Elverum produced and engineered the album, as with many of her previous releases. It was released on March 10, 2009, on Olympia label K Records.

Critical reception

The track received positive reviews, including 4/5 stars from Allmusic, a positive review in Dusted Magazine, 7.8/10 by Pitchfork Media, 8/10 by PopMatters, and 3.5/5 stars from Spin.

According to PopMatters, "The musical marriage of Mirah and Elvrum is one of those rare perfect meeting of the minds—Jay-Z and Kanye, Butch Vig and Kurt Cobain, Phil Spector and... basically anyone who can sing. One could easily imagine Mirah being just another songwriter, singing turgid ballads about loneliness over an acoustic guitar (and indeed there is the occasional disturbing flash of this in her work), but through the intelligent production of Elvrum, and indeed, some of the other producers on (a)spera, she is able to set her thoughts upon soaring mountains of musical genius."

Track listing

Personnel 
Songwriting, etc.
Mirah - vocals, songwriting, etc.
 Christopher Doulgeris – Bass, Guitar, Piano, Vocals, Producer, Organ (Pump), Horn Arrangements, String Arrangements

Production
 Phil Elverum – Producer, Engineer, Guitar, Piano, Cymbals, Organ (Hammond), 
 Bryce Panic – Producer, Percussion, Bongos, Drums, Vocals, Kalimba, Bells, Claves, Vibraphone, Hi Hat
 Tucker Martine – Producer, Engineer, Mixing
 Kane Mathis – Producer, Kora
 Adam Selzer – Producer, Engineer, Mixing
 Barry Corliss – Mastering
 Liz Haley – Photography, Cover Collage

Instrumentals
 Jef Brown – Sax (Baritone), Sax (Tenor)
 Chris Funk – Dobro, Mandolin, Celeste, Hurdygurdy, Dulcimer (Hammer)
 Lori Goldston – Cello
 Cory Gray – Trumpet
 Radio Sloan – Guitar
 Doug Jenkins – Cello
 Robert Andrew Jones – Double Bass
 Emily Kingan – Caixa
 Justin Mackovich – Violin
 Lisa Molinaro – Viola
 Cynthia Nelson – Flute
 Tara Jane O'Neil – Bass, Guitar, Guitar (Bass)
 Toussaint Perrault – Trombone, Trumpet, Tuba
 Mehmet "Memo" Vurkaç – Caixa, Pandeiro, Repique, Surdo

References

External links
MirahMusic.com

Mirah albums
2009 albums
K Records albums